Transport for Wales may refer to:

KeolisAmey Wales, train operator using the Transport for Wales brand from 14 October 2018 until 6 February 2021
Transport for Wales, a government agency
Transport for Wales Rail, train operator using the Transport for Wales brand since 7 February 2021

See also
Transport in Wales, a general overview of transport in Wales
Transport in New South Wales, a general overview of transport in New South Wales, Australia
Transport for NSW, an agency of the New South Wales Government in Australia